Tarin Rock is a locality, railway siding and rock formation on the Wagin to Lake Grace branch line, located approximately 18 km east of Kukerin in Western Australia.

The surrounding areas produce wheat and other cereal crops. The primary remnants of the town include the Tarin Rock Tennis Club, the surge receival site for Cooperative Bulk Handling and the cemetery to the south.

References

External links
 History of Tarin Rock area

Wheatbelt (Western Australia)
Towns in Western Australia
Grain receival points of Western Australia